Don Mattingly (born c. 1931) was a Canadian football player who played for the Winnipeg Blue Bombers. He is the brother of Bruce Mattingly and Ray Mattingly.

References

1930s births
Living people
Place of birth missing (living people)
Winnipeg Blue Bombers players